Lopharcha erioptila is a species of moth of the family Tortricidae first described by Edward Meyrick in 1912. It is found in Sri Lanka.

References

Moths described in 1912
Lopharcha